Mediator of RNA polymerase II transcription subunit 22 is an enzyme that in humans is encoded by the MED22 gene.

Function 

This gene is located in the surfeit gene cluster, a group of very tightly linked housekeeping genes that do not share sequence similarity. The gene is oriented in a head-to-head fashion with RPL7A (SURF3) and the two genes share a bidirectional promoter. The encoded proteins are localized to the cytoplasm. Two alternative transcript variants encoding different isoforms have been identified for this gene.

Interactions 

MED22 has been shown to interact with MED30.

Model organisms 

Model organisms have been used in the study of MED22 function. A conditional knockout mouse line called Med22tm1a(EUCOMM)Wtsi was generated at the Wellcome Trust Sanger Institute. Male and female animals underwent a standardized phenotypic screen to determine the effects of deletion. Additional screens performed:  - In-depth immunological phenotyping

References

Further reading